Brice Herbert Goldsborough (March 20, 1889 – December 23, 1927) was an American aviation instrument designer at Sperry Gyroscope and later founded the Pioneer Instrument Company. He flew aboard the Spirit of St. Louis with Charles Lindbergh in two test flights. He died in an attempt to cross the Atlantic Ocean with Frances Wilson Grayson aboard The Dawn.

Birth and early career
Brice was born in Sioux City, Iowa on  March 30, 1889. His brother was Charles Frances Goldsborough.

In 1910, he was serving in the United States Navy and living in Washington, D.C., and he was working as an electrician. He moved to Long Island and later to Manhattan. After serving two four-year terms in the Navy, he and Morris Titterington, the inventor of the ground induction compass, formed the Pioneer Instrument Company in 1919. In 1923, they moved the company to 754 Lexington Ave. in Brooklyn, after buying Brandis & Sons Company. Charles H. Colvin joined the company and was elected president, with both Brice and Morris as vice presidents.

1926 Ford Reliability NationalTour
Walter Beech (1891-1950) and Brice Herbert Goldsborough won the 1926 Ford Reliability National Air Tour aboard their Travel Air B6 airplane. Brice also flew with Charles Augustus Lindbergh (1902-1974) aboard the Spirit of St. Louis in test flights from Curtiss Field as an "instrument expert" on May 13, 1927 for 10 minutes and May 15, 1927 for 15 minutes. Lindbergh's record breaking flight was on May 20–21, 1927.

The crash
On December 23, 1927 Frances Wilson Grayson with Brice H. Goldsborough as her navigator left from Curtis Field in New York for Harbour Grace, Newfoundland. Her plan was to leave from Newfoundland on a record setting transatlantic flight to London on Christmas day. Her plane, The Dawn was to be flown by Oskar Omdal, a lieutenant in the Norwegian Navy. Grayson may have planned to fly the plane in shifts with him. Goldsborough would have been the navigator and Frank Koehler was to be the radio operator. Her plane never reached Newfoundland and sank in the water. There were several accounts of receiving radio messages from the plane when it was in distress. The bodies and the airplane were never recovered.

Family
Brice's son was Frank Goldsborough (1910–1930), who was a record-setting aviator who also died in a crash.

Commemoration
In 1928, the Ontario Surveyor General named a number of lakes in the northwest of the province to honour aviators who had perished during 1927, mainly in attempting oceanic flights. These include Goldsborough Lake, Grayson Lake and Omdahl  Lake which are all found in close proximity to each other in the Wabakimi Provincial Park.

See also
List of missing aircraft

Notes

References

The Washington Post; December 26, 1927; New York, December 25, 1927 (Associated Press) Mrs. Frances Wilson Grayson, who has been missing since she took off Friday with three companions for Harbor Grace, Newfoundland, was preparing to undertake her fourth attempt within three months to fly the Atlantic in her Sikorsky amphibian plane, the Dawn.
The New York Times; December 26, 1927, page 1; "Grayson Plane Radioed 'Something Wrong' Friday Night; Then the Signaling Ceased, Silent for 54 Hours Since; Probably Lost Off The Nova Scotia Coast In A Storm"
The New York Times; December 26, 1927, page 2; "Goldsborough a Veteran"
The New York Times; December 26, 1927, page 1; "Goldsborough's Wife Spends His Christmas Gift To Pay For Plane Search For The Dawn"
December 26, 1927; 
Frederick Post; Frederick, Maryland; December 28, 1927; "Hope Dwindling in Plane Search"
Time; January 2, 1928; "Broken Dawn"
The New York Times; March 2, 1928, page 08; "Widow Of Aviator Denies Dawn Story"
Time; May 12, 1930; "American Boy. A flight from New York to Los Angeles, begun on Monday and completed Sunday, is not in itself remarkable. But if the flyer be the young son of a crack airman who met spectacular death; and if the boy seeks a "junior speed record," public fancy is captured. Last week Frank Goldsborough, 19, son of the late Brice Goldsborough, crossed the U. S. in 34 hr. 3 min. flying time, in a biplane named American Boy. ..."
Time; July 28, 1930; "Goodwill Tour. In the course of a tour of 100 smalltown Exchange Clubs, to demonstrate the dependability of aviation for passenger travel, Frank Goldsborough, 19, son of the late Brice Goldsborough, took off from Cleveland for Keene, New Hampshire In the Green Mountains, he plowed into a peasoup fog. ..."

1880s births
1927 deaths
Aviators killed in aviation accidents or incidents in Canada
Missing aviators
Missing person cases in Canada
Victims of aviation accidents or incidents in 1927